The Škoda 13 T (also Škoda Elektra) is a five carbody section low-floor uni-directional tram, developed by Škoda Transportation for the Brno tram system.

The vehicle's front was designed by Porsche Design Group. The 13 T has six axles, and the low-floor area represents 48% of the entire vehicle floor. It is based on the Škoda 14 T. While 14 T has a front door leading to the driver's cabin only, in 13 T the front door leads to the passenger compartment.

Deliveries 

The vehicles delivered from late 2010 differ from the preceding ones in array of passenger seats – while the initial trams have the seats in high-floor sections sideways to the driving direction (so the passengers face each other with a passage in between the lines of seats), the newer trams have the seats located in the driving direction.

20 more trams were delivered in 2016.

Gallery

See also 
 Predecessor: Škoda 05 T – "Vektra"
 Successor: Škoda 15 T – "ForCity"
 Related "Elektra" models: 14 T (Prague), 16 T (Wroclaw uni-directional), 19 T (Wroclaw bi-directional)

References

External links 

Information on Škoda webpages

Tram vehicles of the Czech Republic
Škoda trams

de:Škoda Elektra#13T für Brünn